Daniel Asia (born June 27, 1953) is an American composer. He was born in Seattle, Washington, in the United States of America.

Biography
He received a B.A. degree from Hampshire College and a M.M. from the Yale School of Music. His major teachers include Jacob Druckman, Stephen Albert, Gunther Schuller, and Isang Yun in composition, and Arthur Weisberg in conducting. Asia's works ranges from solo pieces to large-scale multi-movement works for orchestra, including five symphonies.

He served on the faculty of the Oberlin Conservatory of Music as Assistant Professor of Contemporary Music and Wind Ensemble from 1981 to 1986. In 1986–88, a UK Fulbright Arts Fellowship and a Guggenheim Fellowship enabled him to work in London as a visiting lecturer at City University. Since 1988, he has been Professor of Composition and head of the composition department at the University of Arizona in Tucson. He conducts the New York-based contemporary chamber ensemble The Musical Elements, which he co-founded in 1977. Asia founded and directs the American Culture and Ideas Initiative.

As a blogger, Asia contributes articles on music and culture to The Huffington Post. In 2013, he gained notoriety after receiving international responses for an April 25 article entitled "Carter is Dead."

Awards 
From 1991-1994, Asia was the Meet the Composer/Composer In Residence with the Phoenix Symphony. He has been the recipient of a Meet The Composer/Reader's Digest Consortium Commission, United Kingdom Fulbright Arts Award Fellowship, a Guggenheim Fellowship, four NEA Composers Grants, a M. B. Rockefeller Grant, an Aaron Copland Fund for Music Grant, MacDowell Colony and Tanglewood Fellowships, ASCAP and BMI composition prizes, and a DAAD Fellowship for study in the Federal Republic of Germany. Asia is the 2010 recipient of the American Academy of Arts and Letters award (2010).

Works 
 1973 – Sound Shapes, for SSAATTBB chorus and pitch pipes
 1974–75 – On the Surface, for soprano, piano, harp, cello, and percussion
 1975 – Dream Sequence I, for amplified trombone
 1975 – Piano Set I for solo piano
 1976 – Piano Set II (or Popsicle Upside Down on the Pavement) for two pianos
 1976 – String Quartet No. 1
 1976 – Miles Mix, for tape
 1978 – Why (?) Jacob for chorus and piano
 1979 – Orange, for viola
 1980–81 – Rivalries, for chamber orchestra
 1983 – Why (?) Jacob for solo piano
 1984 – Three Movements, for trumpet and orchestra
 1985 – String Quartet No. 2
 1987 – Scherzo Sonata for solo piano
 1987 – Symphony No. 1
 1988 – B for J, for flute, bass clarinet, trombone, vibraphone, electric organ, violin, viola, and cello
 1989 – Quartet for piano, violin, viola, and cello
 1988–90 – Symphony No. 2 "Celebration" (Khagiga: In Memoriam Leonard Bernstein)
 1990 – Black Light, for orchestra
 1991 – At the Far Edge, for orchestra
 1992 – Symphony No. 3
 1993 – Gateways, for orchestra
 1993 – Symphony No. 4
 1994 – Concerto for Piano and Orchestra
 1995 – Embers, for flute and guitar
 1997 – Concerto for Cello and Orchestra
 1998-99 – Piano Variations 
 1999 - Piano Trio
 2001 – Sonata for Violin and Piano
 2002 - "Momentary Lapses", for Ben Verdery (guitar and violin)
 2004 – New Set, for guitar and violin
 2004 – Two Rages (Ragflections, No Time) 
 2006 – Why (?) Jacob for orchestra 
 2008 – Symphony No. 5
 2011 – The Tin Angel (opera)
 2016 – Divine Madness: An Oratorio 
 2017 – Iris for four-hand piano
 2017 – Symphony No. 6 "Iris"

Articles

Huffington Post 
 2012 - "Breath in a Ram's Horn: Why Classical Music is Like Jewish Prayer"
 2013 - "An Open Letter to a New University President"
 2013 - "The Put On of the Century"
 2013 - "Final Response on The Put On of the Century"
 2013 - "Carter is Dead"
 2013 - "A Short Musing on Schuller's Musings"
 2013 - "A London Sojourn"
 2014 - "Butterfly, Bach, and Breasts in the Windy City, Part 1"
 2014 - "The Case for Barber and Britten"
 2014 - "In the Windy City Part 2"
 2014 - "The Last of the Midwest for Now"
 2014 - "Betsey Johnson in Tucson"
 2014 - "Music I (Mostly) Hold Dear"
 2014 - "Music I (Mostly) Hold Dear: Ligeti"
 2014 - "Music I (Mostly) Hold Dear: Steve Reich"
 2014 - "Music I (Mostly) Hold Dear: Glass"
 2014 - "Music I (Mostly) Hold Dear: Takemitsu"
 2014 - "Music I (Mostly) Hold Dear: Brown and Feldman"
 2014 - "Music I (Mostly) Hold Dear: Beaser"
 2014 - "Music I (Mostly) Hold Dear: John Adams"
 2014 - "Music I (Mostly) Hold Dear: Frederic Rzewski"
 2014 - "Tale of Two Concertos"
 2014 - "Music I (Mostly) Hold Dear: John Corigliano and David Del Tredici"
 2014 - "Music I (Mostly) Hold Dear: Robert Dick"
 2014 - "Tito Munoz and the Phoenix Symphony"
 2014 - "Music in the Southwest Part 2: The Tucson Symphony Orchestra"
 2015 - "Music I (Mostly) Hold Dear: Lerdal String Quartets 1-3"
 2015 - "Beethoven: Anguish and Triumph by Jan Swafford"
 2015 - "Music I (Mostly) Hold Dear: George Rochberg"
 2015 - "Concertos of Jaffe, Tower, Albert, and Rouse"

References
 Chute, James. 2001. "Asia, Daniel". The New Grove Dictionary of Music and Musicians, second edition, edited by Stanley Sadie and John Tyrrell. London: Macmillan Publishers.
 Daniel Asia official site
 Page at the University of Arizona
 Daniel Asia at the HuffPost

1953 births
20th-century classical composers
21st-century classical composers
American male classical composers
American classical composers
Hampshire College alumni
Living people
Musicians from Seattle
Yale School of Music alumni
Oberlin College faculty
University of Arizona faculty
Pupils of Jacob Druckman
21st-century American composers
20th-century American composers
20th-century American male musicians
21st-century American male musicians
Summit Records artists